Mbasakana is an island in the Solomon Islands; it is located in Malaita Province.

References

Islands of the Solomon Islands